Exploration geology may refer to:

Exploration geophysics, a branch of geophysics which uses surface methods to detect or infer geological structures
Mineral exploration
Mining geology
Prospecting